State Highway 99, abbreviated SH-99, is a north–south state highway through central Oklahoma. It runs from the Texas border at Lake Texoma to the Kansas border near Lake Hulah. The highway overlaps US-377 for over half its length.

SH-99 continues as K-99 after crossing the border into Kansas.

State Highway 99 began as State Highway 48, a short highway connecting Ada to Holdenville. This highway was gradually expanded until it became a border-to-border route. In 1938, it was renumbered to match K-99, which was renumbered from K-11 the same day.

Route description

US-377/SH-99
US-377 crosses Lake Texoma on a bridge from Grayson County, Texas into Marshall County, Oklahoma. Five miles north of this intersection, US-377/SH-99 serve as the northern terminus for SH-99C, a child route of SH-99. The routes then head into Madill, where they form a brief concurrency with US-70 and SH-199. US-377/SH-99 head northeast out of town and enter Johnston County.

West of Tishomingo, US-377/SH-99 pick up SH-22, which follows them east to the county seat. The same junction in Tishomingo where SH-22 splits away is also the northern terminus of SH-78.  north of Tishomingo, the routes share a short concurrency with SH-7. US-377/SH-99 go  without another highway junction, which is with SH-99A, a spur to unincorporated Harden City.

The two highways interchange with SH-3, a freeway at this point, near Ahloso. US-377/SH-99 merge onto the freeway, which becomes the Richardson Loop around the west side of Ada. At the southwest corner of the loop, SH-1 joins.  further north, an interchange serves as the western terminus of SH-19; also at this interchange, SH-3 splits into SH-3E and SH-3W, the latter of which exits the highway to concur with SH-19. At the next interchange, SH-1 splits off, and the freeway downgrades to expressway.

The highway crosses the Canadian River into Seminole County north of Byng. Just after the bridge, US-377/SH-3E/99 intersect SH-39 and SH-56; this is their eastern and western termini respectively. Near Bowlegs, SH-59 joins the concurrency, splitting off again after . As the road enters Seminole, it has an interchange with US-270, where SH-3E splits off. SH-9 also is accessible by interchange in Seminole. US-377/SH-99 encounter another spur of the latter, SH-99A, in unincorporated Little. The routes then have an interchange at I-40, Exit 200.

US-377/SH-99 cross over the North Canadian River and cross a panhandle of Pottawatomie County before entering Lincoln County. Just north of the county line, the routes pass through Prague.

Stroud and the end of US-377
In Stroud, SH-99 has two highway junctions, one of which is the northern terminus of US-377. In central Stroud, the highway meets SH-66, formerly the celebrated Route 66.

Signage in Stroud is unclear on where the northern terminus of US-377 is, implying that it continues north of SH-66 to at least I-44. ODOT sources differ on where the northern terminus of the highway is. According to the Control Section Map Book, the north end of US-377 is at SH-66. Another map published by ODOT of Stroud implies that the route extends north of the ramps to and from I-44 to at least the bridge over the turnpike. The US-377 highway log shows US-377 ending at I-44.  The inset strip map of the Turner Turnpike on the ODOT state map omits US-377 entirely.

North of Stroud
SH-99 bypasses Drumright to the northwest, after which it meets up with an old alignment leading back to Drumright and SH-33, now numbered SH-99B but unsigned. After turning back north, it crosses the Cimarron River at Oilton, and has an interchange with the Cimarron Turnpike between Jennings and Hallett.

It is then concurrent with US-64 for  before passing through Cleveland, where it crosses the Arkansas River. Throughout its final , in Osage County, the highway passes through a relatively sparse region, though it meets State Highway 20 in Hominy and overlaps SH-11 south of Pawhuska (the county seat) and US-60 north of the city.

History

The original SH-48

State Highway 99 traces its roots back to the first State Highway 48, which was first established on January 19, 1927. This highway connected Ada to Holdenville; it roughly followed present-day SH-99 until about 2 miles north of the Canadian River, it then turned east and passed 1 mile south of the unincorporated town of Vamoosa, after which it followed the route of today's SH-56. After 10 miles, it passed through Sasakwa, in which it turned north and ended at the original SH-3, at the intersection called "Five-Mile Corner", west of Holdenville. The 1928 state highway map shows the highway extended to SH-9 (now US-62) near Prague along the present-day SH-99 alignment, with the Canadian River crossing as a toll bridge. By January 1, 1929, the route had been realigned to pass through Konawa. The old designation between the Canadian River and SH-3 was replaced shortly after by SH-56.

In 1931, SH-48 was greatly expanded. The route was extended northward to US-66 in Stroud. At its southern end, it was extended along a new alignment, which began at SH-19, present day SH-3, southeast of Ada and ran through Tishomingo and Madill to end at the Red River northwest of Denison, Texas, where it met Texas State Highway 91. Also that year, a second section of SH-48 was established, taking over a large portion of what was then SH-25; the remainder of the route was integrated into US-60.

On March 1, 1932, a new section of road was designated as State Highway 48, connecting Stroud to SH-33 west of Drumright. As a result, the SH-48 designation was able to follow existing roads to link up with its previously-disconnected northern section. Thus, SH-48 became a border-to-border highway, linking Texas and its SH-91 to K-11 at the Kansas state line.

Renumbering and realignments
On May 17, 1938, both Kansas and Oklahoma renumbered K-11 and OK-48 respectively to bear the number "99", providing continuity between the states. At this time, SH-99 followed the same basic corridor of the present-day route from Madill north to Kansas. However, SH-48's designation was still in use from May 1938 to February 1941. The SH-48 designation was then made into the route passing through Konawa, which the SH-99 designation bypassed. The portion of SH-48 from SH-99 to Konawa would later become part of SH-39.

In January 1944, Denison Dam was placed into operation, creating Lake Texoma. As a result, a portion of SH-99 between Madill and Texas was inundated. On May 5, 1958, the route was realigned to once again reach Texas; it now crossed a bridge further upstream, connecting to Texas State Highway 10, which was subsequently renumbered to TX-99.

This was remedied on December 9, 1968, when the highway was changed to a straighter alignment bypassing Konawa. The old road heading west into Konawa became part of SH-39.

Another bypass occurred in 1977, this time in Drumright. SH-99 was changed to bypass the town on February 7, 1977, and the old alignment that was not part of SH-33 became SH-99B.

Designation as US-377
The Oklahoma Department of Highways had proposed portions of State Highway 99 for inclusion in the United States Numbered Highways system several times. One such application made in 1953 suggested that the entirety of SH-99 become a U.S. Route, while another suggested a northern terminus at US-64 near Cleveland. On June 18, 1964, AASHTO accepted an extension of US-377 from Texas to US-70 in Madill. The Department of Highways, and later the Department of Transportation, submitted an application to extend US-377 from Madill to US-64 in Cleveland eight times between December 1964 and 1980.

In 1991, ODOT signed the route to Stroud along SH-99 without AASHTO approval.

Spurs
SH-99 has two lettered spurs:

 SH-99A is a designation for two distinct highways:
 A connector highway from US-377/SH-99 to the unincorporated town of Harden City. It was originally known as SH-61A.
 A highway that runs from west of Little, Oklahoma to SH-3E, east to SH-48 near Bearden.
 SH-99B has one previous and one present highway
 A -long highway in Drumright, connecting SH-33 north to SH-99, forming the east edge of a loop around town. It is a former alignment of SH-99.
 Former route commissioned in 1948 connecting Bowlegs to Wewoka. It was renumbered to SH-59 in 1965 to extend SH-59 from its former terminus 3 miles north of Bowlegs
 SH-99C connects US-377/SH-99 in Madill to SH-32 near Lake Texoma.
 SH-99D was a loop north of Hominy, Oklahoma serving the nearby state prison, Connors Correctional Center. The loop was decommissioned in the 1990s, and the bridge over Bird Creek is no longer passable.

Junction list

References

099
Ada, Oklahoma
Transportation in Marshall County, Oklahoma
Transportation in Johnston County, Oklahoma
Transportation in Pontotoc County, Oklahoma
Transportation in Seminole County, Oklahoma
Transportation in Pottawatomie County, Oklahoma
Transportation in Lincoln County, Oklahoma
Transportation in Payne County, Oklahoma
Transportation in Creek County, Oklahoma
Transportation in Pawnee County, Oklahoma
Transportation in Osage County, Oklahoma